NA-187 Jampur is a constituency for the National Assembly of Pakistan. It mainly includes the area of Jampur Tehsil. Before the 2018 delimitations, it also included the town of Fazilpur, but it has since been moved to the new NA-194 (Rajanpur-II).

Election 2002 

General elections were held on 10 Oct 2002. Sardar Muhammad Jaffar Khan Leghari of National Alliance won by 59,783 votes.

Election 2008 

General elections were held on 18 Feb 2008. Sardar Muhammad Jaffar Khan Leghari of PML-Q won by 50,440 votes.

Election 2013 

General elections were held on 11 May 2013. Sardar Muhammad Jaffar Khan Leghari of PML-N won by 101,705 votes and became the  member of National Assembly.

Election 2018 

General elections are scheduled to be held on 25 July 2018.

By-election 2023 
A by-election will be held on 26 February 2023 due to the death of Jaffar Khan Leghari, the previous MNA from this seat. Mohsin Leghari won this seat by a margin of 35,174 votes.

See also
NA-186 Dera Ghazi Khan-II
NA-188 Jampur-cum-Rajanpur

References

External links 
Election result's official website

NA-174